Ailurophobia (pronunciation: aɪˌlʊər əˈfoʊ bi ə) is the persistent and excessive fear or hatred of cats.
Like other specific phobias, the exact cause of ailurophobia is unknown, and potential treatment generally involves therapy. Other names for ailurophobia include: felinophobia, elurophobia, gatophobia, and cat phobia. A person with this phobia is known as an ailurophobe.

Description
Ailurophobia is relatively uncommon compared to other animal phobias, such as ophidiophobia or arachnophobia. Ailurophobes may experience panic and fear when thinking about cats, imagining an encounter with a cat, inadvertently making physical contact with a cat, or seeing depictions of cats in media. The fear can also prevent the ailurophobe from doing certain activities, like visiting friends' houses, for fear of encountering a cat. They may experience extreme anxiety and fear when hearing meowing, hissing, or other sounds that the ailurophobe associates with cats. In one case, it was reported that a patient with ailurophobia was unable to touch clothing that had a soft, fur-like texture, possibly due to the clothing's similarity to a cat's fur.

Causes 
Though the exact cause of ailurophobia is unknown, ailurophobes often trace their fear back to early childhood. This is a trend observed in many other specific phobias, especially those involving animals. One theory is that a singular traumatic incident, like being attacked by a cat or witnessing a cat attack someone else, can trigger the development of this phobia. Other theories as to the cause of ailurophobia include exposure to someone else's ailurophobia, or being inundated with troubling information about the danger of cats.

Another explanation could be that humans are somewhat preconditioned to fear felines because the ancestors of big cats preyed upon human ancestors. This may be the origin of leophobia (fear of lions), tigriphobia (fear of tigers), leopardaliphobia (fear of leopards) and acynonixphobia (fear of cheetahs). Fearing these predators is rational because the danger they present; however, fearing domestic cats is irrational, due to their small size.

Treatment
It is widely believed that one of the best treatments for animal phobia is exposure therapy. A particular form of exposure therapy called systematic desensitization has been successful for ailurophobes in the past. Exposure therapy is conducted by systematically exposing a patient to stimuli that are increasingly fear-inducing while only progressing when the patient is comfortable with the prior stimulus. For example, one ailurophobic patient underwent exposure therapy for her fear by being exposed to fur-like fabric, pictures of cats, a toy cat, and finally a friendly live kitten, which the patient subsequently adopted; as the kitten grew and remained friendly, the patient was able to be less afraid of full-grown cats. This method is used to help patients with both ailurophobia and cynophobia.

There are no medications designed to treat ailurophobia. However, medications that relieve anxiety and stress, such as beta blockers and benzodiazepines, can help to mitigate symptoms. D-cycloserine has been linked to facilitating better results in exposure therapy.

See also
 List of phobias
 Steven Bouquet, Brighton Cat Killer

References

Further reading
 
 

Zoophobias
Felids and humans
Phobias